Mały Potok is a river of Poland, a tributary of the Kłobucki Potok.

Rivers of Poland